The Album is the 2007 debut album by the Dutch duo & Jump-musicians Jeckyll & Hyde, released on 18 May 2007 in the Netherlands through label Digidance. It has spawned two hit singles to date, "Frozen Flame" and "Free fall", and "Time Flies" has also received airplay. It was their first album.

Track listing
"Intro" – 1:54
"La Dans Macabre" – 4:02
"Lost in Space" – 3:23
"Frozen Flame" – 3:34
"The Lost Files" – 3:50
"The Flipside" – 3:21
"Precious Dreamer" – 4:25
"Freefall" – 3:28
"Frozen Flame" [Wezz & Fisher Extended Remix] – 7:29
"Lost in Time" – 4:03
"Kick This One" – 4:12
"In Trance Of" – 3:41
"Time Flies" – 3:40
"End of Time" – 3:36
"Play It Loud" [Noise Provider Remix] – 4:13
"Universal Nation" (Bonus Track) – 3:42

Charts

Weekly charts

Year-end charts

References

External links
 Jeckyll & Hyde's Official Site
 Freefall - official music video
 Time Flies - official music video

2007 debut albums